is a railway station in Suruga-ku, Shizuoka, Shizuoka Prefecture, Japan, operated by the private railway company, Shizuoka Railway (Shizutetsu).

Lines
Pref. Art Museum Station  is a station on the Shizuoka–Shimizu Line and is 5.7 kilometers from the starting point of the line at Shin-Shizuoka Station.

Station layout
The station has two side platforms, with a building built above the tracks on the west side of the station. The station entrance is located on the west side of the Shin-Shizuoka direction platform, and has automated ticket machines, and automated turnstiles, which accept the LuLuCa smart card ticketing system as well as the PiTaPa and ICOCA IC cards, as well as a copy of Rodin's The Thinker. The station is wheelchair accessible.

Platforms

Adjacent stations

Station history
Pref. Art Museum Station was established on March 25, 1986, with the relocation of the Shizuoka Prefectural Art Museum nearby. It is the newest station on the Shizuoka–Shimizu Line.

Passenger statistics
In fiscal 2017, the station was used by an average of 914 passengers daily (boarding passengers only).

Surrounding area
Shizuoka Prefectural Art Museum
University of Shizuoka
Shizuoka Prefectural Central Library

See also
 List of railway stations in Japan

References

External links

 Shizuoka Railway official website

}

Railway stations in Shizuoka Prefecture
Railway stations in Japan opened in 1986
Railway stations in Shizuoka (city)